is a train station in the city of Saku, Nagano, Japan, operated by East Japan Railway Company (JR East).

Lines
Nakagomi Station is served by the Koumi Line and is 65.5 kilometers from the terminus of the line at Kobuchizawa Station.

Station layout
The station consists of one ground-level side platform and one island platform connected by a footbridge. The station has a Midori no Madoguchi staffed ticket office.

Platforms

History
Nakagomi Station opened on 8 August 1915.  With the dissolution and privatization of JNR on April 1, 1987, the station came under the control of the East Japan Railway Company (JR East).

Passenger statistics
In fiscal 2015, the station was used by an average of 995 passengers daily (boarding passengers only).

Surrounding area
Iwamurada High School
Sakudaura General Technical School
Saku Chosei High School
Chikuma River

See also
 List of railway stations in Japan

References

External links

 JR East station information 

Railway stations in Nagano Prefecture
Railway stations in Japan opened in 1915
Stations of East Japan Railway Company
Koumi Line
Saku, Nagano